Lemieux may refer to:

 Lemieux (surname)
 Lemieux, Ontario, a ghost town in Ontario
 Lemieux, Quebec, a municipality in Québec
 Lemieux Island, in the middle of the Ottawa River, National Capital Region, Canada
 Lemieux Library, Seattle University, Washington, U.S.
 Lemieux–Johnson oxidation, a chemical reaction named after Raymond Lemieux and W. S. Johnson